is a 2009 Japanese Comedy film directed by Eiichirō Hasumi. It was released in Japan on 18 April. The film stars Haruka Ayase as Mikako Terajima, the lead actress; Suzuka Ohgo as Mikako (Young); Munetaka Aoki as Kenji Horiuchi; Tōru Nakamura as Kazue Shiro; Hiromasa Taguchi as Ryuo (Volleyball Coach); Takuya Ishida as Volleyball senior; Ken Mitsuishi as head coach. The film was produced by Warner Bros. studios and distributed by Toei Company.

Reception
Haruka Ayase won the 52nd Blue Ribbon Awards for Best Actress for her role in the film. Ian Bartholomew from Taipei Times said that despite having an erotic name the  Oppai Volleyball is an innocuous piece of inconsequential fluff with no aspirations to be anything else.

References

External links
 

Films directed by Eiichirō Hasumi
Films scored by Naoki Satō